Soul Meeting is a 1961 Atlantic Records album of recordings made by Ray Charles and Milt Jackson in 1957. The album was later re-issued together with the earlier Soul Brothers (1958), on a 2 CD compilation together with other 'bonus' tracks from the same Charles and Jackson recording sessions.

Reception

On release the album was given a rating of 3.5 out of 5 in the February 1963 issue of Down Beat magazine.  In a retrospective review for AllMusic, Cub Koda described the music as "bluesy jazz in a laid-back manner".

Track listing
All songs composed by Ray Charles except as indicated.

Original LP release
LP side A
"Hallelujah, I Love Her So" – 5:27
"Blue Genius" – 6:38
"X-Ray Blues" – 7:01

LP side B
"Soul Meeting" (Milt Jackson) – 6:03
"Love on My Mind" – 3:45
"Bags of Blues" (Jackson) – 8:49

Later CD compilation/re-issue
CD disc 1
 "How Long Blues" (Leroy Carr) – 9:16
 "Cosmic Ray" – 5:23
 "The Genius After Hours" – 5:24
 "Charlesville" – 4:55
 "Bags Of Blues" (Jackson) – 8:50
 "'Deed I Do" (Walter Hirsch, Fred Rose) – 5:50
 "Blue Funk" – 8:05

CD disc 2
 "Soul Brothers" (Quincy Jones) – 9:34
 "Bag's Guitar Blues" (Jackson) – 6:27
 "Soul Meeting" (Jackson) – 6:04
 "Hallelujah, I Love Her So" – 5:29
 "Blue Genius" – 6:40
 "X-Ray Blues" – 8:10
 "Love On My Mind" – 3:46

Personnel

Ray Charles – vocals, piano, alto saxophone
Milt Jackson – vibraphone
Billy Mitchell – tenor saxophone
Kenny Burrell – guitar
Oscar Pettiford – bass
Percy Heath – bass
Connie Kay – drums
Art Taylor – drums
 Tom Dowd –  engineer

References

Other sources
 Atlantic Records 1360
 [ Soul Meeting] at allmusic.com
 Soul Meeting at discogs.com

1958 albums
Ray Charles albums
Milt Jackson albums
Albums produced by Tom Dowd
Atlantic Records albums
Collaborative albums